Leucocephalonemertes is a monotypic genus of worms belonging to the family Lineidae. The only species is Leucocephalonemertes aurantiaca.

The species is found in Europe.

References

Nemerteans